Sir Cornelius Marshall Warmington, 1st Baronet QC (5 June 1842 – 12 December 1908) was an English barrister and Liberal politician.

Warmington was born at Colchester, Essex. He became a member of the Middle Temple and was invested as Queen's Counsel in 1882. In 1885 he was elected as Member of Parliament for West Monmouthshire. He held the seat for 10 years, and gave it up in 1895 to make way for William Vernon Harcourt. Warmington was at various times Treasurer and Master of Middle Temple. He was created a baronet, of Pembridge Square, on 28 July 1908, six months before his death.

Warmington married Anne Winch daughter of Edward Winch of Chatham  and they had a family. His son Denham succeeded to the baronetcy.

References

External links 
 

1842 births
1908 deaths
Baronets in the Baronetage of the United Kingdom
Liberal Party (UK) MPs for Welsh constituencies
Members of the Middle Temple
People from Colchester
19th-century King's Counsel
UK MPs 1885–1886
UK MPs 1886–1892
UK MPs 1892–1895